Postipuu School is a primary school in Espoo, Finland. It consists pre-school, primary and secondary school level. There are around 250 pupils and 45 staff members at Postipuu. The pupils represent many different nationalities, as do the staff members. Since 2016, the school principal has been Anne Suomala.

External links

 Postipuu School website

Schools in Finland
Education in Espoo
International schools in Finland